According to the American Marketing Association (AMA) "The distinction of “AMA Fellow” is given to members in good standing of the AMA who have made significant contributions to the research, theory and practice of marketing, and/or to the service and activities of the AMA over a prolonged period of time."

2021
Christian Homburg, University of Manheim and University of Manchester
Deborah MacInnis, University of Southern California
JB Steenkamp, University of North Carolina at Chapel Hill
David Stewart, Loyola Marymount University
Beth Walker, Colorado State University
Jerome Williams, Rutgers University-Newark

2020
Mary Jo Bitner, Arizona State University
Vijay Mahajan, University of Texas
Rajendra Srivastava, Indian School of Business

2019
Mary Gilly, University of California-Irvine
Bernard Jaworski, Claremont Graduate University
Linda Price, University of Oregon
Gerard Tellis, University of Southern California

2018
Wayne DeSarbo, Pennsylvania State University
V. Srinivasan, Stanford University
Michel Wedel, University of Maryland

2017
Ajay Kohli,  Georgia Institute of Technology
V. Kumar, Georgia State University
John Lynch, University of Colorado
Christine Moorman, Duke University

2016
Ruth Bolton, Arizona State University
Katherine Lemon, Boston College
A. Parasuraman, University of Miami
Vithala R. Rao, Cornell University

2015
Richard Bagozzi, University of Michigan
Frank Bass, University of Texas
Leonard Berry, Texas A&M University
James Bettman, Duke University
Gilbert Churchill, University of Wisconsin-Madison 
George Day, University of Pennsylvania 
Paul E. Green, University of Pennsylvania*
Shelby D. Hunt, Texas Tech University 
Philip Kotler, Northwestern University 
William Lazer, Michigan State University 
Donald Lehmann, Columbia University
Sidney Levy, University of Arizona
Gary Lilien, Pennsylvania State University
Robert Lusch, University of Arizona
Richard J. Lutz, University of Florida
Kent Monroe, University of Illinois
Leigh McAlister, University of Texas
Donald Morrison, UCLA
William Perreault, University of North Carolina
Robert Peterson, University of Texas at Austin
Roland Rust, University of Maryland
Jagdish Sheth, Emory University
Richard Staelin, Duke University
Louis Stern, Northwestern University
Rajan Varadarajan, Texas A&M University
Barton Weitz, University of Florida
William Wilkie, University of Notre Dame
Jerry Wind, University of Pennsylvania
Russell Winer, New York University
Gerald Zaltman, Harvard University
Valarie Zeithaml, University of North Carolina

References

Fellows of the American Marketing Association